Nguyễn Phúc Thuần (1754–1777) was one of the Nguyễn lords who ruled over the southern portion of Vietnam from the 16th-18th centuries. The collapse of the Nguyễn lords intensified during Thuần's reign, many uprisings broke out throughout the central part of Vietnam, including the Tây Sơn revolt; as well as the offensive of the Trịnh lords from northern Vietnam. He tried to re-establish the Nguyễn lords' authority but failed to do so. At last, he was captured and executed along with his followers and almost all his family members by Tây Sơn rebel general Nguyễn Huệ in 1777.

References
Chapuis, Oscar (1995). "A History of Vietnam". Greenwood Publishing Group. . pp138–141.

1754 births
1777 deaths
Thuan
Child monarchs from Asia